Success Chioma Wogu (born 28 January 1999) is a Nigerian footballer who plays for Yanga Princess in the Tanzanian Women's Premier League. She previously played for FC Minsk in the Belarusian Premier League. She also features for Nigeria women's national football team at national level. She made her debut appearance at the Africa Women Cup of Nations at age 17.

Career 
Wogu was top scorer (six goals) for Confluence Queens in the 2014 Nigeria Women Premier League season, which was her first season in the league. In a 2017 Nigeria Women Premier League game between Rivers Angels and Heartland Queens, Wogu scored a goal to enable Angels retain the top position. After showing fine form at home, Wogu missed chances that resulted to the end of Rivers Angels ten games home winning streak.

Despite being part of the Nigeria qualification games for the 2014 African Women's Championship, Wogu was dropped by head coach, Edwin Okon in the final list. However, in the 2016 edition, she made the squad, contributing an assist from the bench in her first game against Mali.

References 

1999 births
Living people
Nigerian women's footballers
Nigeria women's international footballers
Rivers Angels F.C. players
Women's association football forwards
Confluence Queens F.C. players
FC Minsk (women) players
Sportspeople from Ibadan
Expatriate footballers in the Tanzanian Women's Premier League